Catherine Ann "Cathy" Hearn-Röthenmund (born June 1, 1958) is an American slalom kayaker who competed from the late 1970s to the early 2000s.

She won ten medals at the ICF Canoe Slalom World Championships with two golds (K1: 1979, K1 team: 1979), three silvers (K1: 1981, K1 team: 1989, 1993), and five bronzes (K1: 1989, 1997, K1 team: 1977, 1981, 1987).

Hearn also competed in two Summer Olympics, earning her best finish of seventh in the K1 event in Atlanta in 1996.

Her brother, David Hearn, and her ex-husband, Lecky Haller, also competed for the United States in canoe slalom. Her brother-in-law is a former Swiss kayaker Mathias Röthenmund.

As of 2009, Hearn serves as a coach for the United States canoe slalom team.

World Cup individual podiums

References
ICF medalists for Olympic and World Championships - Part 2: rest of flatwater (now sprint) and remaining canoeing disciplines: 1936-2007.

USA Canoe-Kayak Staff Directory featuring Hearn. - accessed 13 October 2009.

1958 births
American female canoeists
Canoeists at the 1992 Summer Olympics
Canoeists at the 1996 Summer Olympics
Living people
Olympic canoeists of the United States
International whitewater paddlers
Medalists at the ICF Canoe Slalom World Championships
21st-century American women